Emmanuel Shinkut Daniel (born 17 December 1993) is a Nigerian football goalkeeper who represented Nigeria at the 2015 African Games and 2016 Summer Olympics.

International career
Daniel got his first call up to the senior Nigeria side for a 2018 FIFA World Cup qualifier against Zambia in October 2016.

Honours
Nigeria U23
 Olympic Bronze Medal: 2016

References

1993 births
Nigerian footballers
Footballers at the 2016 Summer Olympics
Olympic footballers of Nigeria
Living people
Rangers International F.C. players
Medalists at the 2016 Summer Olympics
Olympic bronze medalists for Nigeria
Olympic medalists in football
Association football goalkeepers
African Games bronze medalists for Nigeria
African Games medalists in football
Competitors at the 2015 African Games